The former Rock Island Depot is a historic railroad station at the junction of Front and Center Streets in downtown Lonoke, Arkansas.  It is a long, rectangular brick building, topped by a steeply-pitched gabled tile roof.  Its gable ends are partially stepped and raised above the roof pitch in the Jacobethan style.  It stands south of the area where the Rock Island Line railroad tracks ran, and has a three-sided telegrapher's booth projecting from its north side.  It was built in 1912, and served as a passenger and freight station for many years, and now houses the local chamber of commerce.

The building was listed on the National Register of Historic Places in 1984.

See also
National Register of Historic Places listings in Lonoke County, Arkansas

References

Railway stations on the National Register of Historic Places in Arkansas
Tudor Revival architecture in Arkansas
Railway stations in the United States opened in 1912
Buildings and structures in Lonoke, Arkansas
National Register of Historic Places in Lonoke County, Arkansas
Historic district contributing properties in Arkansas
Lonoke
Former railway stations in Arkansas